Catherine Cooksey may refer to:
 Catherine Cooksey (educator)
 Catherine Cooksey (chemist)